The Long Slide: Thirty Years in American Journalism is a nonfiction book by political commentator Tucker Carlson. Published by Simon & Schuster, the book is a collection of Carlson's essays, spanning several decades.  The publisher says The Long Slide "delivers a few of his favorite pieces—annotated with new commentary and insight—to memorialize the tolerance and diversity of thought that the media used to celebrate instead of punish."

The introduction to the book also discuses its own publisher's actions and the controversy surrounding their withdrawal from publishing Missouri Senator Josh Hawley's The Tyranny of Big Tech earlier in the year, and contrasting it with their publication of Hunter Biden's Beautiful Things.

References 

2021 non-fiction books
American political books
Books about television
Books about the 2016 United States presidential election
English-language books
Simon & Schuster books
Books by Tucker Carlson